Alero Olympio is a Ghanaian architect who practiced extensively in Ghana and was based in Edinburgh, Scotland. She is the architect who designed the Kokrobitey Institute. This institute includes the Alero Olympio Design Center, which was named in her honor.

Career 
Alero Olympio was internationally renowned for her commitment to using local materials such as laterite, wood and stone, and her passion for leveraging local experience and expertise to seek alternative construction methods. She has traveled extensively both in Africa and around the world, translating her experience through her design and architectural innovations.

Death 
Alero battled cancer for 6 years and died in Edinburgh on August 31, 2005.

Books 

 Akosua in Brazil, 1970.

References 

Ghanaian architects
Women architects
Year of birth missing
2005 deaths